Julia Ford (born 7 August 1963) is a British actress, voice actress and director.

Early life
She was born in Chester, Cheshire and grew up in Sutton Weaver. She attended Helsby County Grammar School.

Career
Her acting work includes theatre, film, radio and television productions. She played the lead role of Agnes in Molière's School For Wives at The National Theatre, aged 23. In 2017 she directed In His Kiss for BBC Radio 4. In 2015 and 2016 she playing Lydia Lambert in Husbands and Sons at the National Theatre. 
In 2018 she directed Harlan Coben's Safe for Netflix. In 2019 she directed a new three-part series for ITV Sticks and Stones. In 2022 she directed the last 3 episodes of the BBC Series "Everything I Know about Love".

Filmography

Film

Television

References

External links

Actresses from Cheshire
Actors from Chester
British television actresses
People from Cheshire West and Chester
Living people
1963 births